East Williamson is a hamlet located within the Town of Williamson, Wayne County, New York, United States near the Sodus town line. It is located two miles (3 km) east of the hamlet of Williamson, at an elevation of 453 feet (138 m). The primary cross roads where the hamlet is located are Ridge Road (CR 103), East Townline Road (CR 118) and Marion-East Williamson Road (CR 218). N.Y. Route 104 passes just north of East Williamson.

A United States Post Office is located in East Williamson with a ZIP Code of 14449.

References

Hamlets in Wayne County, New York
Hamlets in New York (state)
Populated places in Wayne County, New York